Joona Koppanen (born February 25, 1998) is a Finnish professional ice hockey forward who is currently playing for the  Boston Bruins of the National Hockey League (NHL). Koppanen was drafted by the Bruins, 135th overall, in the 2016 NHL Entry Draft.

Playing career
Koppanen played his youth hockey in his native Finland within local club, Ilves. In impressing through the Under-20 Junior A level, Koppanen was selected by the Boston Bruins in the fifth round, 135th overall, in the 2016 NHL Entry Draft.

On April 14, 2017, Koppanen was signed to a three-year, entry-level contract with the Boston Bruins. He was initially returned on loan by the Bruins to his original club, Ilves, to make his professional debut in the 2017–18 Liiga season. Appearing in 45 games, Koppanen collected 2 goals and 14 points with Tampere before suffering elimination. On March 14, 2018, he was reassigned to make his North American debut in joining the Bruins AHL affiliate in Providence.

Entering the final season of his entry-level contract with the Bruins, on 22 September 2020, with the North American season to be delayed, Koppanen was loaned by Boston to join his original Finnish youth club, KOOVEE of the Mestis, to begin the 2020–21 season. Showing his offensive acumen, Koppanen registered 6 goals and 17 points in 10 games before he was elevated on loan to affiliate and former club, Ilves of the Liiga, on  28 October 2020.

Career statistics

Regular season and playoffs

International

Awards and honours

References

External links

1998 births
Living people
Atlanta Gladiators players
Boston Bruins draft picks
Boston Bruins players
Finnish ice hockey left wingers
Ilves players
KOOVEE players
Providence Bruins players
Ice hockey people from Tampere